Colchicum boisseri is a plant species in the genus Colchicum (the autumn crocuses) native to  southern Greece and south-western Turkey but cultivated elsewhere as an ornamental. The species is unique for its spreading, rhizomatous bulbs. It blooms well with 5 cm (2") blooms in a bright cherry pink. The stamens are yellow. The flowers have no tessellations, only a white line down the centre of each petal.  It is named after botanist Pierre Edmond Boissier.

References

boissieri
Flora of Greece
Plants described in 1876
Garden plants